"Wordy Rappinghood" is the debut single by American new wave band Tom Tom Club, from their 1981 self-titled debut album. It uses part of a traditional Moroccan children's song and game, "A Ram Sam Sam", made popular by the 1971 Rolf Harris recording. In the United States, the song topped the Billboard Disco Top 80 chart along with "Genius of Love".

Structure, instrumentation and production
The song opens with the sound of a typewriter and features jarring synthesizer chords and a distinctive drum break. The words of the fifth verse are spoken in French: "Mots pressés, mots sensés, mots qui disent la vérité, mots maudits, mots mentis, mots qui manquent le fruit d'esprit" which translate as: "hurried words, sensible words, words that tell the truth, cursed words, lying words, words that lack the fruit of the mind."

Tina Weymouth and Chris Frantz of Tom Tom Club had bought a house in Nassau, Bahamas, next door to Chris Blackwell, owner of Island Records, and it was Blackwell who arranged the recording in his Compass Point Studios. Frantz and Weymouth brought in Steven Stanley, a 21-year-old keyboard player who had been the sound engineer on Ian Dury's album Lord Upminster, and bass player Monte Browne, a former member of T-Connection.

Track listings
US 12" single
A. "Wordy Rappinghood" (Special 12" Version) – 6:39
B. "Spooks" – 6:28

European 7" single
A. "Wordy Rappinghood" – 3:50
B. "Wordy Rappinghood" (You Don't Ever Stop) – 4:05

European 12" single
A. "Wordy Rappinghood" (Remix) – 6:42
B. "Elephant" – 5:11

Chart performance

Weekly charts

Year-end charts

Chicks on Speed version

"Wordy Rappinghood" was covered by German electroclash group Chicks on Speed and released as the second single from their album 99 Cents in 2003. Their version featured guest vocals by other female musicians such as Miss Kittin, Kevin Blechdom, Le Tigre, Adult.'s Nicola Kuperus, and Tom Tom Club founding member Tina Weymouth.

This cover was sampled in the song "Really Rappin' Something" by the Kleptones from the album From Detroit to J.A. in 2005. In 2007, the Playgroup remix of Chicks on Speed's version appeared on the compilation album FabricLive.33 by Spank Rock.

Critical reception
Christopher Lloyd of Drowned in Sound'' described the song as an "ultra-catchy seven minute dancefloor killer".

Track listings
European CD maxi single
"Wordy Rappinghood" (Radio Edit) – 4:20	
"Wordy Rappinghood" (The Playgroup Remix) – 5:23	
"Wordy Rappinghood" (Dave Clarke's Non Techno Mix) – 3:37	
"Wordy Rappinghood" (The Playgroup Instrumental Mix) – 5:24
"Wordy Rappinghood" (music video)

German 12" single
A1. "Wordy Rappinghood" (Album Mix) – 6:26
A2. "Wordy Rappinghood" (Acapella Version) – 4:10
B1. "Wordy Rappinghood" (The Playgroup Remix) – 5:23
B2. "Wordy Rappinghood" (Dave Clarke's Non Techno Mix) – 3:37

Charts

Uffie version

French-American electronic artist Uffie covered the song in 2011. The single, produced by labelmate DJ Mehdi, was released on April 18, 2011, through Ed Banger Records, Because Music and Elektra Records. Her version was used in a global Evian ad campaign.

See also
List of number-one dance singles of 1982 (U.S.)
List of number-one hits (Belgium)

References

External links

1981 songs
1981 debut singles
2003 singles
2011 singles
Tom Tom Club songs
Because Music singles
Elektra Records singles
Funk songs
Island Records singles
PolyGram singles
Sire Records singles
Songs about hip hop
Songs about language
Songs written by Chris Frantz
Songs written by Steven Stanley
Songs written by Tina Weymouth
Uffie songs
Ultratop 50 Singles (Flanders) number-one singles
Warner Records singles
Songs based on children's songs